Louis Goldring (1857 - 8 October 1934) was a storekeeper and politician in colonial Queensland, Australia. He was a member of the Queensland Legislative Assembly for Flinders.

Biography 
Louis Goldring was born in 1857 in London, England, the son of Henry Goldring and his wife Abigail (née Silverton).

Goldring was a prominent citizen of Hughenden and  the first mayor of the Town of Hughenden. He was a member of the Queensland Legislative Assembly from 1888 to 1893, representing the electorate of Flinders. Goldring was a supporter of Samuel Griffith.

Goldring died on Mon 8 October 1934 in Townsville.

References

Members of the Queensland Legislative Assembly
1857 births
1934 deaths